Kenneth Lee Clarkson is an American computer scientist known for his research in computational geometry. He is a researcher at the IBM Almaden Research Center, and co-editor-in-chief of the Journal of Computational Geometry.

Biography
Clarkson received his Ph.D. from Stanford University in 1984, under the supervision of Andrew Yao. Until 2007 he worked for Bell Labs.

In 1998 he was co-chair of the ACM Symposium on Computational Geometry.

Research
Clarkson's primary research interests are in computational geometry.

His most highly cited paper, with Peter Shor, uses random sampling to devise optimal randomized algorithms for several problems of constructing geometric structures, following up on an earlier singly-authored paper by Clarkson on the same subject.
It includes algorithms for finding all  intersections among a set of  line segments in the plane in expected time , finding the diameter of a set of  points in three dimensions in expected time , and constructing the convex hull of  points in -dimensional Euclidean space in expected time . The same paper also uses random sampling to prove bounds in discrete geometry, and in particular to give tight bounds on the number of ≤k-sets.

Clarkson has also written highly cited papers on the complexity of arrangements of curves and surfaces, nearest neighbor search, motion planning, and low-dimensional linear programming and LP-type problems.

Awards and honors
In 2008 Clarkson was elected a Fellow of the ACM for his "contributions to computational geometry."

References

External links
Clarkson's web page at IBM

Year of birth missing (living people)
Living people
Researchers in geometric algorithms
Stanford University alumni
Fellows of the Association for Computing Machinery